Emanuel Diego Salvador Ruiz (born 7 July 1978) is a former Argentine professional footballer, who played as a striker.

Club career
He began his career in the youth sectors of Argentinos Juniors, being transferred with a group of youth footballers amongst them, Juan Roman Riquelme to Boca Juniors in 1996. On 10 August 1997 he made his debut with the first team the following year under Hector Veira in a 4–3 win over Rosario Central. However, he had no place at that time within the team and was loaned one year to Rosario Central, where he wasn't a first team regular either. In 1999, he returned to Boca, and this time under Carlos Bianchi's command, to have continuity in the main squad.

In 2000 he was transferred to the Greek club AEK Athens as a choice of the team's coach, Giannis Pathiakakis. There after spending a mediocre season in Greece failing to satisfy the clubs management, he was loaned to Union Santa Fe. Since then it has gone through several teams of Argentina, Mexico, Honduras, Israel and Peru, without actually settling in any of them.

In 2008, he left for Israel by the club Hapoel Nir to play in the 2nd division of the country. Then in the middle of the following year, the club Cienciano of Cuzco, where he played 8 matches not having a good performance. In January 2010, he joined everything was on track to become player San José however, a problem in his right knee prevented him from successfully pass medical exams and he did not sign for Bolivian club. After that incident and failing to sign for any club, he retired at the age of 31.

After football
In 2014 Ruiz created football academies in Argentina giving them the name of the club that gave him the chance to play in Europe, "AEK FC".

References

External links

Living people
1978 births
Argentine footballers
Footballers from Buenos Aires
Association football forwards
AEK Athens F.C. players
Real C.D. España players
Club Atlético Colón footballers
Boca Juniors footballers
Deportivo Toluca F.C. players
Rosario Central footballers
San Lorenzo de Almagro footballers
Talleres de Córdoba footballers
Hapoel Nir Ramat HaSharon F.C. players
Argentine Primera División players
Super League Greece players
Liga MX players
Liga Nacional de Fútbol Profesional de Honduras players
Liga Leumit players
Primera B de Chile players